The Air Force 3701 is the presidential aircraft for the President of the Republic of China (Taiwan). The aircraft is based upon a Boeing 737-800 and operated by the Republic of China Air Force.

History
 4 February 2000: The aircraft was bought from Boeing in the United States with a budget of NT$2 billion from the Ministry of National Defense for its purchase and modification. It flew from Seattle and arrived three days later.
 7 February 2000: The aircraft arrived in Taipei.
 18 March 2000: The cabin crews were formally commissioned.
 June 2005: The son of President Chen Shui-bian,  applied to complete his wedding with the aircraft, which caused controversy. Chen Chih-chung explained  that Taiwan High Speed Rail was not yet operational. If people involved in the wedding rushed from Taipei to Taichung, the long distance would impose inconveniences on people along the route, so an application to use Air Force 3701 was submitted.

Design
The aircraft underwent modifications in few areas, such as the front section of its fuselage. It is also equipped with satellite for continuous communication throughout the flight. Modifications are done to the base aircraft to fit Presidential travel.

See also
 Air transports of heads of state and government

References

Presidency of the Republic of China
Presidential aircraft
Republic of China Air Force
Vehicles of Taiwan
Individual aircraft